The Medisch Spectrum Twente (MST) is the hospital of the city of Enschede. It is a top-clinical center offering secondary and limited tertiary care.

Facilities
The hospitals has a license for 1070 beds, over 200 medical specialists and circa 4000 total employees.

Aside from the regular clinical departments, it also has tertiary care departments such as cardiothoracic surgery, neurosurgery, advanced oncological care, radio therapy, bone marrow transplantations, hemodialysis, a large hospital pharmacy, and a regional level I trauma center. It is one of the largest non-academic hospitals of the Netherlands.

The hospital does not have its own trauma helicopter, but an ADAC helicopter from the neighboring German town of Rheine frequently crosses the border when the local (Dutch) ambulance control center requests it. The hospital has a brand-new helicopter platform.

Satellite locations

Oldenzaal
The MST includes a small location in the town of Oldenzaal. It is mainly an ambulatory facility, though some small low-risk surgeries which do not require more than two days of hospitalization are also performed there. Most regular diagnostic procedures can be carried out in the Oldenzaal facility. Almost all specialties have a satellite department there.
It also has a small urgent care department which is open in the morning, afternoon and evening but not at night; ambulances do not bring patients here, but drive them directly to the main facility in Enschede instead. The hospital's 1070 beds include the Oldenzaal location as well.

Haaksbergen and Losser
Only ambulatory care is offered at the Haaksbergen and Losser facilities. A number of MST specialists spend one or two days per week in Haaksbergen or Losser.

Hospitals in the Netherlands
Hospitals with year of establishment missing
Buildings and structures in Enschede